Maxim Narozhnyy (1975-2011) was a Paralympian athlete from Russia competing mainly in category F42 shot put events.

He competed in the 2008 Summer Paralympics in Beijing, China. There he won a silver medal in the men's F42 shot put event.

References

External links
 

Paralympic athletes of Russia
Athletes (track and field) at the 2008 Summer Paralympics
Paralympic silver medalists for Russia
1975 births
2011 deaths
Medalists at the 2008 Summer Paralympics
Paralympic medalists in athletics (track and field)
Russian male shot putters
21st-century Russian people